People who served as the mayor of the Municipality of St Peters are:

References

Mayors Saint Peters
Saint Peters, Mayors
Mayors of Saint Peters